Muldoon is an Irish family name. It is represented throughout the world where descendants of emigrants of people bearing that name have settled; e.g. U.S., Canada, Australia, New Zealand, South Africa and other countries.

Muldoon is an anglicisation of the Irish surname Ó Maoldúin, meaning "descendant of the disciple of St. Dúin". It first appears in the Lebor na hUidre or the Book of the Dun Cow. Another Máel Dúin was one of the Kings from Mag Rath in Dál Riata, a Gaelic 'kingdom' that covered parts of north-eastern Ulster and south-western Scotland (see List of the kings of Dál Riata), Máel Dúin mac Conaill (died c. 689).

According to The Surnames of Ireland by Edward MacLysaght, there are three distinct septs of Muldoon: Galway (around Uí Maine), Clare (whose names were generally Anglicised to Malone), and in Co. Fermanagh where the name is most common.

Famous Muldoons 
 Máel Dúin, 8th-century Irish monk
 Bristow Muldoon, Scottish politician
 Enda Muldoon, Gaelic footballer
 Patrick Muldoon, American actor
 Paul Muldoon, Northern Ireland poet
 Pete Muldoon, American ice hockey coach
 John Muldoon, Connacht Rugby Pro 12 winning captain. 
 Rhys Muldoon, Australian actor
 Sir Robert Muldoon, Prime Minister of New Zealand (1975–1984)
 Sylvan Muldoon, American writer
 William Muldoon, professional wrestler
 Royston Maldoom, choreographer
 Maureen Muldoon, American actress

Fictional characters
 The Muldoon Family, fictional characters at the center of Netflix's The Sinner, Season 4 (2022)
 Officer Francis Muldoon, a fictional character in the television show Car 54, Where Are You? and the movie of the same name
 Seamus Muldoon, fictional character in Survival of the Dead
 Robert Muldoon, a fictional character in the Jurassic Park series of novels and films
 Spotty Muldoon, a fictional character created by Peter Cook, and featured in his 1965 song The Ballad of Spotty Muldoon
 Roberta Muldoon, a fictional character played by John Lithgow in The World According to Garp
 Skip Muldoon, a fictional character in the video game Hitman: Blood Money
 Jo Muldoon, a fictional character in the Lady Gregory play, "Spreading the News"
 Detective Muldoon, a fictional character in the 2020 film The Grudge
 Percy Muldoon, a fictional character in the TV series The Sinner season fourth

Others
 Solid Muldoon, a supposedly preserved prehistoric body, actually a hoax
 Sgt. Muldoon (pro-wrestler) ring name of John Callahan

See also 
 Curse of Muldoon
 The Muldoons, a rock group featuring the Muldoon family from Detroit